Bjørn Haraldsen Ironside (Bjørn Jærnside; died 1134) was a Danish prince.

Bjørn was one of the 15 sons of Prince Harald Kesja. His mother was Ragnild Magnusdatter. Bjørn married Princess Katarina Ingesdotter of Sweden, the daughter of King Inge I of Sweden. Bjørn was the father of Christina Bjornsdatter, a Swedish queen.

Bjørn accidentally drowned with his brother Eric in 1134 near Schleswig.

Ancestry

References

House of Estridsen
Danish princes
1134 deaths
Year of birth unknown
Danish prisoners sentenced to death
Executed royalty
Executed Danish people
People executed by Denmark by decapitation
12th-century executions